Krasnoselsky District  is an administrative and municipal district (raion), one of the twenty-four in Kostroma Oblast, Russia. It is located in the southwest of the oblast. Its administrative center is the urban locality (an urban-type settlement) of Krasnoye-na-Volge. Population:  19,580 (2002 Census);  The population of Krasnoye-na-Volge accounts for 43.0% of the district's total population.

References

Notes

Sources

Districts of Kostroma Oblast